Douglas Maradona Campos Dangui  or simply  Dodô  (born June 28, 1990) is a Brazilian striker who plays in Portugal for Novo Horizonte GO. He was born in São Paulo.

References

External links

Dodô at ZeroZero

1990 births
Living people
Brazilian footballers
Brazilian expatriate footballers
Associação Atlética Ponte Preta players
Grêmio Foot-Ball Porto Alegrense players
Ehime FC players
Gamba Osaka players
Gainare Tottori players
Portimonense S.C. players
Expatriate footballers in Japan
Expatriate footballers in Portugal
Brazilian expatriate sportspeople in Portugal
J1 League players
J2 League players
Association football forwards
Footballers from São Paulo (state)